Dr. Jekyll Likes Them Hot is a 1979 Italian film directed by Steno.

Plot 
The evil genius Dr. Jekyll, director of the powerful multinational food company PANTAC which has flooded the world with a large number of pollutants and harmful products, accidentally drinks the "serum of good", turning into a good-natured and placid Mr. Hyde...

Cast 
 Paolo Villaggio as Dr. Jekyll / Mr. Hyde
 Edwige Fenech as Barbara Wimply
 Gianrico Tedeschi as Jeeves
 Gordon Mitchell as Pretorius
 Paolo Paoloni as Director

Production
Dr. Jekyll Likes Them Hot was originally titled as Il dottor Jekill Junior. According to the public register, filming began on July 31, 1978. The film was shot on location in London.

Release
Dr. Jekyll Likes Them Hot was distributed theatrically in Italy by Medusda on 31 August 1979. The film grossed 427,000,000 Italian lire domestically.

References

Footnotes

Sources

External links

1979 films
1970s parody films
Films directed by Stefano Vanzina
Films scored by Armando Trovajoli
Dr. Jekyll and Mr. Hyde films
Italian parody films
Italian comedy films
Films set in London
Parodies of horror
1979 comedy films
1970s Italian films